Jean Paul Yontcha (born 15 May 1983) is a Cameroonian retired professional footballer who played as a striker.

Club career
Born in Yaoundé, Yontcha started his career with Tiko United. In 2002, he signed for CA Bordj Bou Arréridj in Algeria, going on to remain five seasons with the team.

In 2006, Yontcha joined Qatar's Sadd Sports Club, winning an unprecedented (in national football history) quadruple in his first season. Two years later he moved to Europe, penning a deal with Romanian club CS Otopeni and appearing sparingly during the campaign as the team finished in 17th position, with the subsequent Liga I relegation.

Yontcha spent the following seasons in Portugal, starting with C.F. Os Belenenses in 2009–10, again being relegated from top-level football after his team ranked second from the bottom. His first game in the Primeira Liga occurred on 14 August 2009, when he featured the full 90 minutes in a 0–0 away draw against Leixões SC.

In the 2010 summer, Yontcha signed for two years with S.C. Olhanense, scoring three goals in 19 games in his debut season – nine starts, 842 minutes played – as the Algarve side retained their top level status.

International career
In November 2012, aged 29, Yontcha was called up to the Cameroonian national team for the first time in his career. He made his debut on the 14th, appearing in a friendly with Albania.

References

External links

1983 births
Living people
Footballers from Yaoundé
Cameroonian footballers
Association football forwards
CA Bordj Bou Arréridj players
Qatar Stars League players
Al Sadd SC players
Al-Khor SC players
Liga I players
CS Otopeni players
Primeira Liga players
Segunda Divisão players
C.F. Os Belenenses players
S.C. Olhanense players
U.D. Leiria players
Kategoria Superiore players
KF Elbasani players
Cameroon international footballers
Cameroonian expatriate footballers
Expatriate footballers in Algeria
Expatriate footballers in Qatar
Expatriate footballers in Romania
Expatriate footballers in Portugal
Expatriate footballers in Albania
Cameroonian expatriate sportspeople in Algeria
Cameroonian expatriate sportspeople in Portugal